The African Methodist Episcopal Church, usually called the AME Church or AME, is a predominantly African American Methodist denomination. It adheres to Wesleyan-Arminian theology and has a connexional polity. The African Methodist Episcopal Church is the first independent Protestant denomination to be founded by black people; though it welcomes and has members of all ethnicities.

It was founded by Richard Allen (1760–1831)—who was later elected and ordained the AME's first bishop in Philadelphia, Pennsylvania—in 1816 when he called together five African American congregations of the previously established Methodist Episcopal Church (which had been founded either in December 1784 at the famous "Christmas Conference" or at its first General Conference at Lovely Lane Chapel meeting house in old Baltimore Town) by blacks hoping to escape the discrimination that was commonplace in society.

It was among the first denominations in the United States to be founded for this reason (rather than for theological distinctions), and has persistently advocated for the civil and human rights of African Americans through social improvement, religious autonomy, and political engagement while always being open to people of all racial backgrounds. Allen, an previously ordained deacon in the Methodist Episcopal Church, was elected by the gathered ministers and ordained as its first bishop in 1816 by the first General Conference of the five churches—extending from the three in the Philadelphia area in Pennsylvania to ones in Delaware and Baltimore, Maryland. The denomination then expanded west and through the South, particularly after the American Civil War (1861–1865). By 1906, the AME had a membership of about 500,000 (half a million), more than the combined total of the two other predominantly black American denominations—the Colored Methodist Episcopal Church in America and the African Methodist Episcopal Zion Church, making it the largest major African-American denomination of the Methodist traditions.

The AME Church currently has 20 districts, each with its own bishop: 13 are based in the United States, mostly in the South, while seven are based in Africa. The global membership of the AME is around 2.5 million members, and it remains one of the largest Methodist denominations in the world.

Church name
African The AME Church was created and organized by people of African descent (most descended from enslaved Africans taken to the Americas) as a response to being officially discriminated against by white congregants in the Methodist church. The church was not founded in Africa, nor is it exclusively for people of African descent. It is open and welcoming to people of all ethnic groups, origins, nationalities, and colors, although its congregations are predominantly made up of black Americans.
Methodist The church's roots are in the Methodist church. Members of St. George's Methodist Church left the congregation when faced with racial discrimination, but continued with the Methodist doctrine and the order of worship.
Episcopal The AME Church operates under an episcopal form of church government. The denomination leaders are bishops of the church.

Motto

"God Our Father, Christ Our Redeemer, the Holy Spirit Our Comforter, Humankind Our Family"

Derived from Bishop Daniel Alexander Payne's original motto "God our Father, Christ our Redeemer, Man our Brother", which served as the AME Church motto until the 2008 General Conference, when the current motto was officially adopted.

History

Origins
The AME Church worked out of the Free African Society (FAS), which Richard Allen, Absalom Jones, and other free blacks established in Philadelphia in 1787. They left St. George's Methodist Episcopal Church because of discrimination. Although Allen and Jones were both accepted as preachers, they were limited to black congregations. In addition, the blacks were made to sit in a separate gallery built in the church when their portion of the congregation increased. These former members of St. George's made plans to transform their mutual aid society into an African congregation. Although the group was originally non-denominational, eventually members wanted to affiliate with existing denominations.

Allen led a small group who resolved to remain Methodist. They formed the Bethel African Methodist Episcopal Church in 1793. In general, they adopted the doctrines and form of government of the Methodist Episcopal Church. In 1794 Bethel AME was dedicated with Allen as pastor. To establish Bethel's independence, Allen successfully sued in the Pennsylvania courts in 1807 and 1815 for the right of his congregation to exist as an institution independent of white Methodist congregations.

Because black Methodists in other middle Atlantic communities also encountered racism and desired religious autonomy, Allen called them to meet in Philadelphia in 1816 to form a new Wesleyan denomination. Sixteen representatives, from Bethel African Church in Philadelphia and African churches in Baltimore, MD, Wilmington, DE, Attleboro, PA, and Salem, NJ, met to form a church organization or connection under the title of the "African Methodist Episcopal Church" (AME Church).

Growth
It began with eight clergy and five churches, and by 1846 had grown to 176 clergy, 296 churches, and 17,375 members. Safe Villages like the Village of Lima were setup with nearby AME churches and in sometimes involved in the underground railroad. The 20,000 members in 1856 were located primarily in the North. AME national membership (including probationers and preachers) jumped from 70,000 in 1866 to 207,000 in 1876.

The church also expanded internationally during this period. The British Overseas Territory of Bermuda, 640 miles from Cape Hatteras, North Carolina, was settled in 1609 by the Virginia Company and retained close links with Virginia and the Carolinas (with Charleston settled from Bermuda in 1670 under William Sayle) for the next two centuries, with Bermudians playing both sides during the American War of Independence, being the point from which the blockade of southern Atlantic ports was maintained and the Chesapeake Campaign was launched during the American War of 1812, and being the primary port through which European-manufactured weapons and supplies were smuggled into the Confederacy during the American Civil War. Other Bermudians, such as First Sergeant Robert John Simmons of the 54th Massachusetts Volunteer Infantry Regiment, fought to end slavery in the United States. Among the numerous residents of the American South with ties to Bermuda was Denmark Vesey, who had immigrated to South Carolina from Bermuda as a slave before purchasing his freedom. Vesey was a founder of Mother Emanuel African Methodist Episcopal Church before his execution after conviction in a show trial resulting from white hysteria over an alleged conspiracy for a slave revolt in 1822.

The majority of the population of Bermuda during the first century of settlement was European, with free and enslaved blacks primarily from the Spanish West Indies and Native Americans, primarily from New England (anyone not entirely of European ancestry was counted as coloured). As any child of a coloured and a white parent was counted as coloured, the ratio of the white to coloured population shifted during the course of the 18th Century (4,850 whites and 3,514 coloured in 1721; but 4,755 whites and 5,425 coloured in 1811). The Church of England is the established church, and was the only church originally permitted to operate in Bermuda. Presbyterians were permitted to have a separate church and to conduct their own services during the 18th Century. The Wesleyan Methodists sought to include enslaved blacks and a law was passed by the Parliament of Bermuda in 1800 barring any but Church of England and Presbyterian ministers from preaching. The Methodist Reverend John Stephenson was incarcerated in December, 1800, for six months for preaching to slaves. The law and attitudes changed during the course of the following century, but any church organised by blacks and organising blacks would not be welcomed by the white dominated Government. Stephenson was followed in 1808 by the Reverend Joshua Marsden. There were 136 members of the Society when Marsden left Bermuda in 1812.

Susette Harriet Lloyd travelled to Bermuda in company with the Church of England's Archdeacon of Bermuda Aubrey Spencer. Her visit lasted two years, and her ‘’Sketches of Bermuda’’ (a collection of letters she had written enroute to, and during her stay in, Bermuda, and dedicated to Archdeacon Spencer) was published in 1835, immediately following the 1834 abolition of slavery in Bermuda and the remainder of the British Empire (Bermuda elected to end slavery immediately, becoming the first colony to do so, though all other British colonies except for Antigua availed themselves of an allowance made by the Imperial government enabling them to phase slavery out gradually). Lloyd's book gives a rare contemporary account of Bermudian society immediately prior to the abolition of slavery. Among her many observations of the people of Bermuda, Lloyd noted of the coloured population:

Lloyd's negative comments on the dissenters was in reference to the Wesleyan Methodists. The degree of education of coloured Bermudians would  be noted by later visitors, also. Christiana Rounds wrote in Harper's Magazine (re-published in an advertising pamphlet by A.L Mellen, the Proprietor of the Hamilton Hotel in 1876):

The foundation stone of a Wesleyan Methodist Chapel was laid in St. George's Town on the 8 June 1840, the local Society (by then numbering 37 class leaders, 489 Members, and 20 other communicants) having previously occupied a small, increasingly decrepit building that had been damaged beyond use in a storm in 1839. The inscription on the foundation stone included:

The AME First District website records that in the autumn of 1869, three farsighted Christian men—Benjamin Burchall of St. George’s, William B. Jennings of Devonshire and Charles Roach Ratteray of Somerset—set in motion the wheels that brought African Methodism to Bermuda. By the latter Nineteenth Century, the law in Bermuda specified that any denomination permitted to operate in the United Kingdom should also be permitted in the colony (although only the Church of England, the Presbyterian Church, and the Wesleyan Methodists were permitted to conduct baptisms, weddings and funerals until after the First World War). As the Imperial Government had ruled that the AME Church could operate in the United Kingdom, the first AME church in Bermuda was erected in 1885 in Hamilton Parish, on the shore of Harrington Sound, and titled St. John African Methodist Episcopal Church (the congregation had begun previously as part of the British Methodist Episcopal Church of Canada). Although the Church of England (since 1978, titled the Anglican Church of Bermuda) remains the largest denomination in Bermuda (15.8%), the AME quickly flourished (accounting for 8.6% of the population today), overtaking the Wesleyan Methodists (2.7% today).

The rise of the Wesleyan-Holiness movement in Methodism influenced the African Methodist Episcopal Church, with Jarena Lee and Amanda Smith preaching the doctrine of entire sanctification throughout pulpits of the connexion.

Education
AME put a high premium on education. In the 19th century, the AME Church of Ohio collaborated with the Methodist Episcopal Church, a predominantly white denomination, in sponsoring the second independent historically black college (HBCU), Wilberforce University in Ohio. By 1880, AME operated over 2,000 schools, chiefly in the South, with 155,000 students. For school houses they used church buildings; the ministers and their wives were the teachers; the congregations raised the money to keep schools operating at a time the segregated public schools were starved of funds.

Bishop Turner
After the Civil War Bishop Henry McNeal Turner (1834–1915) was a major leader of the AME and played a role in Republican Party politics. In 1863 during the Civil War, Turner was appointed as the first black chaplain in the United States Colored Troops.  Afterward, he was appointed to the Freedmen's Bureau in Georgia. He settled in Macon, Georgia, and was elected to the state legislature in 1868 during Reconstruction. He planted many AME churches in Georgia after the war.

In 1880 he was elected as the first southern bishop of the AME Church after a fierce battle within the denomination. Angered by the Democrats' regaining power and instituting Jim Crow laws in the late nineteenth century South, Turner was the leader of black nationalism and proposed emigration of blacks to Africa.

Race
The African Methodist Episcopal Church has a unique history as it is the first major religious denomination in the western world that developed because of race rather than theological differences. It was the first African-American denomination organized and incorporated in the United States. The church was born in protest against racial discrimination and slavery. This was in keeping with the Methodist Church's philosophy, whose founder John Wesley had once called the slave-trade "that execrable sum of all villainies." In the 19th century, the AME Church of Ohio collaborated with the Methodist Episcopal Church, a predominantly white denomination, in sponsoring the second independent historically black college (HBCU), Wilberforce University in Ohio. Among Wilberforce University's early founders was Salmon P. Chase, then-governor of Ohio and the future Secretary of Treasury under President Abraham Lincoln.

Other members of the FAS wanted to affiliate with the Episcopal Church and followed Absalom Jones in doing that. In 1792, they founded the African Episcopal Church of St. Thomas, the first Episcopal church in the United States with a founding black congregation. In 1804, Jones was ordained as the first black priest in the Episcopal Church.

While the AME is doctrinally Methodist, clergy, scholars, and lay persons have written works that demonstrate the distinctive racial theology and praxis that have come to define this Wesleyan body. In an address to the 1893 World's Parliament of Religions, Bishop Benjamin W. Arnett reminded the audience of blacks' influence in the formation of Christianity. Bishop Benjamin T. Tanner wrote in 1895 in The Color of Solomon – What? that biblical scholars wrongly portrayed the son of David as a white man. In the post-civil rights era, theologians James Cone, Cecil W. Cone, and Jacqueline Grant, who came from the AME tradition, criticized Euro-centric Christianity and African-American churches for their shortcomings in resolving the plight of those oppressed by racism, sexism, and economic disadvantage.

Beliefs

The AME motto, "God Our Father, Christ Our Redeemer, Holy Spirit Our Comforter, Humankind Our Family", reflects the basic beliefs of the African Methodist Episcopal Church.

The basic foundations of the beliefs of the church can be summarized in the Apostles' Creed, and The Twenty Five Articles of Religion, held in common with other Methodist Episcopal congregations. The church also observes the official bylaws of the AME Church. The "Doctrine and Discipline of the African Methodist Episcopal Church" is revised at every General Conference and published every four years. The AME church also follows the rule that a minister of the denomination must retire at age 75, with bishops, more specifically, being required to retire upon the General Conference nearest their 75th birthday.

Church mission

The Mission of the African Methodist Episcopal Church is to minister to the social, spiritual, physical development of all people. At every level of the Connection and in every local church, the African Methodist Episcopal Church shall engage in carrying out the spirit of the original Free African Society, out of which the AME Church evolved: that is, to seek out and save the lost, and serve the needy. It is also the duty of the Church to continue to encourage all members to become involved in all aspects of church training.  The ultimate purposes are: (1) make available God's biblical principles, (2) spread Christ's liberating gospel, and (3) provide continuing programs which will enhance the entire social development of all people.  In order to meet the needs at every level of the Connection and in every local church, the AME Church shall implement strategies to train all members in: (1) Christian discipleship, (2) Christian leadership, (3) current teaching methods and materials, (4) the history and significance of the AME Church, (5) God's biblical principles, and (6) social development to which all should be applied to daily living.
 preaching the gospel,
 feeding the hungry,
 clothing the naked,
 housing the homeless,
 cheering the fallen,
 providing jobs for the jobless,
 administering to the needs of those in prisons, hospitals, nursing homes, asylums and mental institutions, senior citizens' homes; caring for the sick, the shut-in, the mentally and socially disturbed,
 encouraging thrift and economic advancement., and
 bringing people back into church.

Colleges, seminaries and universities
The African Methodist Episcopal Church has been one of the forerunners of education within the African-American community.

Former colleges & universities of the AME Church:
 Western University (Kansas)
 Campbell College, Jackson, Mississippi – now part of Jackson State University

Senior colleges within the United States:
 Allen University (Columbia, SC) Website
 Edward Waters College (Jacksonville, FL) Website
 Morris Brown College (Atlanta, GA) Website
 Paul Quinn College (Dallas, TX) Website
 Wilberforce University (Wilberforce, OH) Website

Junior colleges within the United States:
 Shorter College (North Little Rock, AR)  Website

Theological seminaries within the United States:
 Dickerson-Green Theological Seminary Website
 Jackson Theological Seminary Website
 Payne Theological Seminary Website
 Turner Theological Seminary Website

Foreign colleges and universities:
 African Methodist Episcopal University, Liberia
 RR Wright Theological Seminary, South Africa

Structure

The General Conference

The General Conference is the supreme body of the African Methodist Episcopal Church. It is composed of the bishops, as ex officio presidents, according to the rank of election, and an equal number of ministerial and lay delegates, elected by each of the Annual Conferences and the lay Electoral Colleges of the Annual Conferences. Other ex officio members are: the General Officers, College Presidents, Deans of Theological Seminaries; Chaplains in the Regular Armed Forces of the U.S.A. The General Conference meets every four years, but may have extra sessions in certain emergencies.

At the General Conference of the AME Church, notable and renowned speakers have been invited to address the clergy and laity of the congregation. Such as in 2008, the church invited then Senator Barack H. Obama, and in 2012, the church invited then First Lady of the United States Michelle Obama.

Council of Bishops

The Council of Bishops is the Executive Branch of the Connectional Church. It has the general oversight of the Church during the interim between General Conferences. The Council of Bishops shall meet annually at such time and place as the majority of the Council shall determine and also at such other times as may be deemed necessary in the discharging its responsibility as the Executive Branch of the African Methodist Episcopal Church. The Council of Bishops shall hold at least two public sessions at each annual meeting. At the first, complaints and petitions against a bishop shall be heard, at the second, the decisions of the Council shall be made public. All decisions shall be in writing.

Board of Incorporators

The Board of Incorporators, also known as the General Board of Trustees, has the supervision, in trust, of all connectional property of the Church and is vested with authority to act in behalf of the Connectional Church wherever necessary.

The General Board

The General Board is in many respects the administrative body and comprises various departmental Commissions made up of the respective Treasurer/CFO, the Secretary/CIO of the AME Church, the Treasurer/CFO and the members of the various Commissions and one bishop as presiding officer with the other bishops associating.

Judicial Council

The Judicial Council is the highest judicatory body of the African Methodist Episcopal Church. It is an appellate court, elected by the General Conference and is amenable to it.

AME Connectional Health Commission

The Connectional Health Commission serves, among other tasks, to help the denomination understand health as an integral part of the faith of the Christian Church, to seek to make our denomination a healing faith community, and to promote the health concerns of its members. One of the initiatives of the commission is the establishment of an interactive website that will allow not only health directors, but the AMEC membership at-large to access health information, complete reports, request assistance. This website serves as a resource for members of the AMEC, and will be the same for anyone who accesses the website. Additionally, as this will be an interactive site, it will allow health directors to enter a password protected chat room to discuss immediate needs and coordinate efforts for relief regionally, nationally and globally.

It is through this website that efforts to distribute information about resources and public health updates, and requests for services may be coordinated nationally. This will allow those who access the website to use one central location for all resource information needs.

Overview

The World Council of Churches estimates the membership of the AME Church at around 2,510,000; 3,817 pastors, 21 bishops and 7,000 congregations.

The AME Church is a member of the National Council of Churches of Christ in the USA (NCC), World Methodist Council, Churches Uniting in Christ, and the World Council of Churches.

The AME Church is not related to either the Union American Methodist Episcopal Church (which was founded in Delaware by Peter Spencer in 1813), or the African Methodist Episcopal Zion Church (which was founded in New York by James Varick). However, all three are within full communion with each other since May 2012.

Districts
The AME Church is divided into 20 districts, spanning North America and Bermuda, the Caribbean, sub-Saharan Africa and parts of South America:
 First District – Bermuda, Delaware, New England, New Jersey, New York, Western New York, and Philadelphia
 Second District – Baltimore, Washington, D.C., Virginia, North Carolina and Western North Carolina
 Third District – Ohio, Pittsburgh, North Ohio, South Ohio and West Virginia
 Fourth District – Indiana, Chicago, Illinois, Michigan, Canada and a mission extension in India
 Fifth District – California, Southern California, Desert Mountain, Midwest, Missouri, and Pacific Northwest
 Sixth District – Georgia, Southwest Georgia, Atlanta-North, Macon, South Georgia and Augusta
 Seventh District – Palmetto, South Carolina, Columbia, Piedmont, Northeast South Carolina and Central South Carolina
 Eighth District – South Mississippi, North Mississippi, Central North Louisiana, and Louisiana
 Ninth District – Alabama River Region, Southeast Alabama, Northeast Alabama, Southwest Alabama, Northwest Alabama
 Tenth District – Texas, Southwest Texas, North Texas and Northwest Texas
 Eleventh District – Florida, Central, South, West Coast, East, Bahamas
 Twelfth District – Oklahoma, Arkansas, East Arkansas, and West Arkansas
 Thirteenth District – Tennessee, East Tennessee, West Tennessee, Kentucky and West Kentucky
 Fourteenth District – Liberia, Central Liberia, Sierra Leone, Ghana, Nigeria, Côte d'Ivoire and Togo-Benin
 Fifteenth District – Angola, Cape, Boland, Eastern Cape, Kalahari, Namibia, and Queenstown
 Sixteenth District – Guyana/Suriname, Virgin Islands, European, Dominican Republic, Haiti, Jamaica, Windward Islands and Brazil
 Seventeenth District – Southeast Zambia, Southwest Zambia, Northeast Zambia, Northwest Zambia, Zambezi, Congo Brazzaville, Katanga, Kananga, Kinshasa, Mbuji-mayi, Rwanda, Burundi and Tshikapa
 Eighteenth District – Botswana, Lesotho, Mozambique, and Eswatini
 Nineteenth District – Orangia, Natal, M.M. Mokone Memorial Conference, East, West
 Twentieth District – Malawi North, Malawi South, Malawi Central, Northeast Zimbabwe, Southwest Zimbabwe, Central Zimbabwe

Bishops (past and present)

The Four Horsemen: important bishops

Current bishops and assignments
 1st Episcopal District – Bishop Julius Harrison McAllister
 2nd Episcopal District – Bishop James Levert Davis
 3rd Episcopal District – Bishop Erreneous Earl McCloud, Jr.
 4th Episcopal District – Bishop John Franklin White
 5th Episcopal District – Bishop Clement W. Fugh
 6th Episcopal District – Bishop Reginald T. Jackson
 7th Episcopal District – Bishop Samuel Lawrence Green Sr.
 8th Episcopal District – Bishop Stafford J. N. Wicker
 9th Episcopal District – Bishop Harry Lee Seawright
 10th Episcopal District – Bishop Adam Jefferson Richardson, Jr., Senior Bishop
 11th Episcopal District – Bishop Frank Madison Reid, III
 12th Episcopal District – Bishop Michael Leon Mitchell
 13th Episcopal District – Bishop E. Anne Henning Byfield
 14th Episcopal District – Bishop Paul J. M. Kawimbe
 15th Episcopal District – Bishop Silvester Scott Beaman
 16th Episcopal District – Bishop Marvin C. Zanders, II
 17th Episcopal District – Bishop David Rwhynica Daniels, Jr.
 18th Episcopal District – Bishop Francine A. Brookins
 19th Episcopal District – Bishop Ronnie Elijah Brailsford
 20th Episcopal District – Bishop Frederick A. Wright
 The Office of Ecumenical Affairs – Bishop Jeffery Nathaniel Leath

Retired bishops
 John Hurst Adams*
 Richard Allen Hildebrand*
 Frederick Hilborn Talbot*
 Hamil Hartford Brookins*
 Vinton Randolph Anderson*
 Frederick Calhoun James
 Frank Curtis Cummings
 Philip Robert Cousin, Sr
 Henry Allen Belin, Jr.
 Richard Allen Chappelle, Sr*
 Vernon Randolph Byrd, Sr. *
 Robert Vaughn Webster
 Zedekiah Lazett Grady*
 Carolyn Tyler Guidry
 Cornal Garnett Henning, Sr.*
 Sarah Frances Davis*
 John Richard Bryant
 William P. Deveaux
 T. Larry Kirkland
 Benjamin F. Lee
 Richard Franklin Norris, Sr.
 Preston Warren Williams, II
 McKinley Young*

* Deceased

General officers
 Marcus T. Henderson Sr., Treasurer/Chief Financial Officer
 John Green, Secretary-Treasurer, Global Witness and Missions
 James F. Miller, Executive Director, Department of Retirement Services
 Marcellus Norris, Executive Director of Church Growth and Development
 Jeffery B. Cooper, General Secretary/CIO
 Teresa Fry Brown, Executive Director, Research and Scholarship and Editor of The A.M.E. Church Review
 Roderick D. Belin, President/Publisher, AMEC Sunday School Union
 John Thomas III, Editor of The Christian Recorder, the official newspaper of the African Methodist Episcopal Church
 Garland F. Pierce, Executive Director of Christian Education

Clergy and educators
 Sarah Allen (1764–1849), Richard Allen's wife, who founded the Daughters of the Conference.
 Bishop Vinton Randolph Anderson (1927–2014), first African American to be elected President of the World Council of Churches, headquarters in Geneva, Switzerland (served 1991–98); author of My Soul Shouts and subject of an edited work (Gayraud Wilmore & Louis Charles Harvey, editors), A Model of A Servant Bishop; first native Bermudian elected a bishop in any church/denomination.
 Daniel Blue (1796–1884), founder of the Saint Andrews African Methodist Episcopal Church in Sacramento, California; the first AME church on the West Coast and the first black church in California.
 John M. Brown (1817–1893) bishop, leader in the underground railroad. He helped open a number of churches and schools, including the Payne Institute which became Allen University in Columbia, South Carolina and Paul Quinn College in Waco, Texas. He was also an early principal of Union Seminary which became Wilberforce University
 Jamal Harrison Bryant (1971– ), founded Empowerment Temple (AME Church) in Baltimore in 2000 with a congregation of 43 people. Today more than 7,500 members attend weekly services at this large influential congregation.
 Bishop Richard Harvey Cain, elected member of U.S. House of Representatives from South Carolina during Reconstruction era.
 Bishop William D. Chappelle (1857–1925), was president of Allen University in Columbia, South Carolina from 1897 to 1899.
 Daniel Coker (1780–1846), born "Issac Wright" in Baltimore, Maryland to mixed-race parents. Famous preacher and abolitionist. Ordained deacon in the new Methodist Episcopal Church by Bishop Francis Asbury in 1802 in Baltimore. Led Bethel AME Church in Baltimore. Participated in the organization of the national AME Church in Philadelphia in 1816. By 1820, sent as missionary to Sierra Leone, British colony in West Africa and considered founder of national Methodist Church there.
 Dennis C. Dickerson, Director of the Research and Scholarship and Professor at Vanderbilt University (retired).
 Bishop William Heard (1850–1937), AME minister and educator. Appointed by the U.S. government as "Minister Resident/Consul General" to Republic of Liberia, (1895–1898).
 King Solomon Dupont, AME clergy member who in the 1950s was the first African-American to seek public office in northern Florida since the Reconstruction era; in 1955, as Vice President of the Tallahassee Civic Association, he led a bus boycott, in which protesters lives were threatened, simultaneous to the Montgomery bus boycott led by Martin Luther King Jr. in Montgomery, Alabama.
 Orishatukeh Faduma, (1855–1946), African American missionary and educator.
 Floyd H. Flake (1945– ), former U.S. Congressman from New York State (1986–1998); senior pastor of the Greater Allen AME Cathedral in Jamaica, New York; former President of Wilberforce University
 Sarah E. Gorham, first female missionary from AME church, dying in Liberia in 1894.
 Bishop Carolyn Tyler Guidry (1937– ), second female AME bishop in church history.
 Bishop Vashti Murphy McKenzie, first female AME bishop in church history, best-selling author.
 Lyman S. Parks (1917–2009), Mayor of Grand Rapids, Michigan (1971–1976); Pastor of First Community AME Church in Grand Rapids.
 Bishop Daniel Payne (1811–1893), historian, educator and AME minister. First African-American president of an African-American university, Wilberforce University, in the U.S.
 Bishop Reverdy Cassius Ransom (1861–1959), one of the founders of NAACP via The Niagara Movement.
 T. W. Stringer (1815–1897), a freeman from Canada and first pastor of Bethel AME Church of Vicksburg in Vicksburg, Mississippi founded in 1864 as Mississippi's first AME church.  At Bethel AME in Vickbsurg, he established the T.W. Stringer Grand Lodge of Freemasonry, Mississippi's first Masonic Lodge.
 Frank M. Reid III (1951– ), Pastor of the Bethel AME Church in Baltimore from 1988 to 2016. Reid started The Bethel Outreach of Love Broadcast; Bethel was the first AME Church to have an international TV broadcast. Was selected as the 26th most influential person in Baltimore by local regional publication, Baltimore Magazine. His congregation's members include the mayor and city comptroller of Baltimore. He consulted for the TV show Amen, and guest starred several times on the popular HBO cable TV series The Wire. As of 2016, he was elevated to episcopal service as the 138th bishop of the AME Church.
 Hiram Rhodes Revels, first African American to serve in the United States Senate, representing Mississippi from 1870 to 1871.
 Calvin H. Sydnor III, the 20th Editor of The Christian Recorder, the official newspaper of the African Methodist Episcopal Church (www.the-Christian-recorder.org)
 Bishop Benjamin Tucker Tanner (1835–1923), author of An Apology for African Methodism (1867), editor of the Christian Recorder, AME publication, and founder of the AME Church Review. As a bishop, presided over AME parishes, first, in Canada, Bermuda, and the West Indies, later, in New England, New York, New Jersey, and eastern Pennsylvania.
 D. Ormonde Walker, 66th bishop of the AME Church and 10th president of Wilberforce University
 Thomas Marcus Decatur Ward (1823–1894), AME missionary, preacher, church leader, and abolitionist
 Bishop Alexander Walker Wayman (1821–1895), born free in Caroline County, Maryland, joined AME Church in 1840, ordained minister three years later. Served as minister of Bethel AME Church in Baltimore (founded 1785), then located on East Saratoga near North Charles, St. Paul Street/Place (currently Preston Gardens), and North Calvert Streets, led "Negro/Colored" delegation in President Abraham Lincoln's funeral procession through Baltimore during stop during train trip back to Springfield, Illinois, April 1865. Lived on Hamilton Street alley behind First Unitarian Church off North Charles and West Franklin Streets.
 Jamye Coleman Williams (1918–2022), educator, community leader. Former editor of the AME Church Review; recipient of the NAACP Presidential Award (1999).
 Rev Clive Pillay (1953– ): community leader. Field Reporter The Christian Recorder, Former Founder ICY: UDF – Inter Church Youth
 Jarena Lee (1783–1864): First woman preacher in the AME church given the blessing to do so by founder, Richard Allen. Prominent AME leader in the Wesleyan-Holiness movement. The First African American woman in the United States to have an autobiography published.
 Juliann Jane Tillman, woman preacher in the AME Church, was well known for her widely reproduced 1844 lithograph portrait.

Ecumenism
In May 2012, The African Methodist Episcopal Church entered into full communion with the racially integrated United Methodist Church, and the predominantly black/African American members of the African Methodist Episcopal Zion Church, African Union Methodist Protestant Church, Christian Methodist Episcopal Church, and Union American Methodist Episcopal Church, in which these Churches agreed to "recognize each other's churches, share sacraments, and affirm their clergy and ministries", bringing a semblance of unity and reconciliation to those church bodies which follow in the footsteps of John and Charles Wesley.

Social issues
The AME Church is active regarding issues of social justice and has invested time in reforming the criminal justice system. The AME Church also opposes "elective abortion". On women's issues, the AME has supported gender equality and, in 2000, first elected a woman to become bishop. In 2004, the denomination voted to prohibit same-sex marriages in its churches, but did not establish a position on ordination. There are openly gay clergy ordained in the AME and "the AME Church’s Doctrine and Discipline has no explicit policy regarding gay clergy". In 2019, the Council of Bishops decided to allow a proposal to allow same-sex marriages in church to be considered at the General Conference in 2020. While debating marriage in 2021, the AME confirmed that, while the church does not allow same-sex marriages, "it does not bar LGBTQ individuals from serving as pastors or otherwise leading the denomination." The AME General Conference voted against a bill to allow same-sex marriages in church while also voting to approve a committee to explore and provide recommendations for changes to church doctrine and discipline and for pastoral care for LGBTQ people.

During the 2016  General Conference, the AME Church invited Hillary Clinton to offer an address to the delegates and clergy. Additionally, the AME Church voted to take "a stand against climate change".  AME Church works with non-partisan VoteRiders to spread state-specific information on voter ID requirements.

See also

 A.M.E. Church Review, quarterly journal of the African Methodist Episcopal Church
 Religion of Black Americans
 African Methodist Episcopal Zion Church
 Black church
 British Methodist Episcopal Church in Canada
 Christian Methodist Episcopal Church
 Churches Uniting in Christ (formerly the Consultation on Church Union [COCU] – founded 1960).
 List of African Methodist Episcopal churches
 Christianity in the United States
 :Category:African Methodist Episcopal bishops
 :Category:Universities and colleges affiliated with the African Methodist Episcopal Church
 14th District of the African Methodist Episcopal Church

References

Further reading
 Bailey, Julius H. Race Patriotism Protest and Print Culture in the AME Church. Knoxville, TN: University of Tennessee Press, 2012.
 Campbell, James T. Songs of Zion: The African Methodist Episcopal Church in the United States and South Africa. New York: Oxford University Press, 1995.
 Cone, James. God Our Father, Christ Our Redeemer, Man Our Brother: A Theological Interpretation of the AME Church, AME Church Review, vol. 106, no. 341 (1991).

 Dickerson, Dennis C. The African Methodist Episcopal Church (Cambridge University Press 2020) excerpt, a major scholarly history.

 Gregg, Howard D. History of the African Methodist Episcopal Church: The Black Church in Action. Nashville, TN: Henry A. Belin, Jr., 1980.
 Wayman, Alexander W. Cyclopaedia of African Methodism. Baltimore: Methodist Episcopal Book Depository, 1882.

External links

 
 Official website of "The Christian Recorder"
 Women's Missionary Society of the AME church
 AMEC Office of Employment Security
 AME Church Storehouse
 AME Church Department of Global Witness & Ministry
 AME Digital Archives at Payne College
 AMEC Department of Christian Education
 The AMEC Lay Organization
 Richard Allen Young Adult Council
 AMECHealth.org The Official AME Health Commission

 
1816 establishments in Pennsylvania
Historically African-American Christian denominations
History of Methodism in the United States
Members of the National Council of Churches
Members of the World Council of Churches
Methodist denominations established in the 19th century
Religious organizations established in 1816